The 1993 Canadian federal election was held on October 25, 1993, to elect members to the House of Commons of Canada of the 35th Parliament of Canada. The incumbent Progressive Conservative Party of Prime Minister Kim Campbell, in office since June 1993, was defeated by the Liberal Party of Canada under the leadership of Jean Chrétien. The Progressive Conservatives were reduced from 156 to just 2 seats.

The emergence of the Bloc Québécois and the Reform Party took critical support from the PCs. The New Democratic Party had their worst ever results and this election remains and the only election where the party polled fewer than one million votes. The Liberals won a majority of seats, and was able to from a majority government. The strength of third parties in this election was unprecedented for Canadian politics. 

In total, 194 out of 295 ridings changed hands.

Results by region

Atlantic Canada 
The Liberals won 30 of the 31 seats in Atlantic Canada. The other seat was St. John in New Brunswick, which Elsie Wayne held for the PCs against the national swing.

Quebec 
Quebec was dominated by the Bloc Québécois, which won enough seats to form the Official Opposition. Liberals won 19 seats in and around the Island of Montreal, but their gains from the Progressive Conservatives were minimal, with 8 exceptions; Bonaventure—Îles-de-la-Madeleine, Laval West, Outremont, Pierrefonds—Dollard, Pontiac—Gatineau—Labelle, Saint-Maurice, Vaudreuil and Verdun—Saint-Paul. Progressive Conservative Minister of Industry Jean Charest held his seat of Sherbrooke, being the only MP from his party to survive the BQ surge. Former PC MP Gilles Bernier held Beauce as an Independent on a narrow majority against the insurgent BQ. He had been barred by Kim Campbell  from running under the PC banner due to fraud charges, of which he was later acquitted.

Ontario 
In Ontario, the Liberals won 98 of 99 seats. The exception being Simcoe Centre, which was won by Ed Harper from the Reform Party. The results were attributed to the vote splitting between the PCs and Reform which allowed the Liberals to be victorious in many of the marginal ridings in rural Southern Ontario.

Western Canada 
In Western Canada, the Progressive Conservatives were wiped out. The New Democratic Party was replaced by the Reform Party as the party representing Western alienation. The Liberals won all but two seats in Manitoba. In Saskatchewan, the NDP held onto most of their seats. In the far west the Reform Party dominated, winning 22 of 26 seats in Alberta and 24 of 32 in British Columbia.

Northern Canada 
In the Northwest Territories, Liberal MP Ethel Blondin-Andrew was re-elected with an increased majority. In Yukon, New Democratic Party leader Audrey McLaughlin held her seat with a decreased majority. Former Mayor of Whitehorse Don Branigan took the Liberals into second place.

Seats changing hands 

Progressive Conservative to Liberal (77)
 Annapolis Valley—Hants
 Bonaventure—Îles-de-la-Madeleine
 Bramalea—Gore—Malton
 Brampton
 Brandon—Souris
 Burlington
 Cambridge
 Carleton—Charlotte
 Central Nova
 Cumberland—Colchester
 Dauphin—Swan River
 Don Valley East
 Don Valley North
 Don Valley West
 Durham
 Edmonton North
 Elgin—Norfolk
 Erie
 Etobicoke Centre
 Etobicoke—Lakeshore
 Fredericton—York—Sunbury
 Fundy—Royal
 Guelph—Wellington
 Halifax West
 Halton—Peel
 Hamilton—Wentworth
 Hastings—Frontenac—Lennox  and Addington
 Huron—Bruce
 Kitchener
 Lachine—Lac-Saint-Louis
 Lanark—Carleton
 Laval West
 Lincoln
 London West
 London—Middlesex
 Madawaska—Victoria
 Markham—Whitchurch—Stouffville
 Mississauga South
 Mississauga West
 Niagara Falls
 Oakville—Milton
 Ontario
 Outremont
 Oxford
 Parry Sound—Muskoka
 Perth—Wellington—Waterloo
 Peterborough
 Pierrefonds—Dollard
 Pontiac—Gatineau—Labelle
 Portage—Interlake
 Provencher
 Regina—Wascana
 Richmond
 Rosedale
 Saint-Maurice
 Sarnia—Lambton
 Scarborough Centre
 Scarborough East
 Selkirk—Red River
 Simcoe North
 Souris—Moose Mountain
 South Shore
 St. Catharines
 St. John's East
 St. John's West
 St. Paul's
 Timiskaming—French River
 Vancouver Centre
 Vancouver South
 Vaudreuil
 Verdun—Saint-Paul
 Victoria—Haliburton
 Waterloo
 Wellington—Grey—Dufferin—Simcoe
 Winnipeg South
 York—Simcoe

Progressive Conservative to Bloc Quebecois (46)
 Abitibi
 Ahuntsic
 Anjou—Rivière-des-Prairies
 Argenteuil—Papineau
 Beauharnois—Salaberry
 Beauport—Montmorency—Orléans
 Bellechasse
 Berthier—Montcalm
 Blainville—Deux-Montagnes
 Bourassa
 Brome—Missisquoi
 Champlain
 Charlesbourg
 Charlevoix
 Chateauguay
 Chicoutimi
 Drummond
 Frontenac
 Gaspé
 Hochelaga—Maisonneuve
 Joliette
 Jonquière
 Kamouraska—Rivière-du-Loup
 La Prairie
 Laurentides
 Laval Centre
 Laval East
 Lévis
 Lotbinière
 Louis-Hébert
 Manicouagan
 Matapédia—Matane
 Mégantic—Compton—Stanstead
 Mercier
 Portneuf
 Québec
 Quebec East
 Richmond—Wolfe
 Rimouski—Témiscouata
 Roberval
 Saint-Hyacinthe—Bagot
 Saint-Jean
 Témiscamingue
 Terrebonne
 Trois-Rivières
 Verchères—Les Patriotes

Progressive Conservative to Reform (35)
 Athabasca
 Calgary Centre
 Calgary North
 Calgary Northeast
 Calgary Southeast
 Calgary Southwest
 Calgary West
 Capilano—Howe Sound
 Cariboo—Chilcotin
 Crowfoot
 Delta
 Edmonton Northwest
 Edmonton Southwest
 Edmonton—Strathcona
 Elk Island
 Fraser Valley East
 Fraser Valley West
 Kindersley—Lloydminster
 Lethbridge
 Lisgar—Marquette
 Macleod
 Medicine Hat
 North Vancouver
 Okanagan Centre
 Peace River
 Prince George—Peace River
 Red Deer
 Simcoe Centre
 St. Albert
 Surrey—White Rock—South Langley
 Swift Current—Maple Creek—Assiniboia
 Vegreville
 Wetaskiwin
 Wild Rose
 Yellowhead

New Democrat to Liberal (17)
 Beaches—Woodbine
 Brant
 Churchill
 Edmonton East
 Essex—Windsor
 Nickel Belt
 Oshawa
 Prince  Albert—Churchill River
 Saskatoon—Dundurn
 Saskatoon—Humboldt
 Sault Ste. Marie
 Thunder Bay—Atikokan
 Timmins—Chapleau
 Trinity—Spadina
 Vancouver East
 Victoria
 Windsor—St. Clair

New Democrat to Reform (17)
 Comox—Alberni
 Esquimalt—Juan de Fuca
 Kootenay East
 Kootenay West—Revelstoke
 Mission—Coquitlam
 Moose Jaw—Lake Centre
 Nanaimo—Cowichan
 New Westminster—Burnaby
 North Island—Powell River
 Okanagan—Shuswap
 Port Moody—Coquitlam
 Prince George—Bulkley Valley
 Saanich—Gulf Islands
 Skeena
 Surrey North
 Yorkton—Melville

Liberal to Bloc Quebecois (1)
 Shefford

New Democrat to Bloc Quebecois (1)
 Chambly

References

See also 

1993 Canadian federal election
Canadian federal election results